Choristella hickmanae is a species of sea snail, a marine gastropod mollusk in the family Lepetellidae.

Description
Shell large for genus (maximum diameter 9 mm), spire height relatively low (height-width ratio of holotype 0.72). Shell wall extremely thin, maximum thickness of broken lip 0.1 mm. Surface dull, yellowish white, periostracum not evident, surface finely pitted. Protoconch and earliest teleoconch whorl missing. Remaining whorls 3.5, rounded, smooth; suture deeply impressed. Umbilicus broad, deep, not obstructed by reflection of inner lip. Spiral sculpture represented only by single narrow ridge deep within umbilicus; axial sculpture lacking, growth increments not apparent. Peristome complete, area of contact with previous whorl minimal. Operculum pale brown, nucleus slightly excentric, final three whorls evenly expanding in multispiral pattern. Height 6.5 mm, width 9 mm.

Distribution
This marine species occurs in the Cascadia Abyssal Plain off Oregon, USA

References

 McLean J.H. (1992). Systematic review of the family Choristellidae (Archeogastropoda: Lepetellacea) with descriptions of new species. The Veliger 35(4): 273-294

Lepetellidae
Gastropods described in 1992